Edward Lees ( 1819 - November 6, 1893) was a member of the Wisconsin State Assembly.

Biography
A Scottish immigrant, Lees first settled in Ottawa, Wisconsin in 1848. His son, Robert Lees, became a member of the Assembly and the Wisconsin State Senate. He died at his home in Gilmanton, Wisconsin on November 6, 1893.

Career
Lees was a member of the Assembly in 1853 and again from 1875 to 1876. In addition, he was chairman of Belvidere, Wisconsin and Cross, Wisconsin and district attorney of Buffalo County, Wisconsin.

References

Scottish emigrants to the United States
People from Waukesha County, Wisconsin
People from Gilmanton, Wisconsin
Members of the Wisconsin State Assembly
Mayors of places in Wisconsin
District attorneys in Wisconsin
1893 deaths
Year of birth uncertain